The economy of Dhanbad is famous for mining, utilities, retail, IT and cement etc. Dhanbad is the second largest city in Jharkhand, India: and in area also. In the terms of populations. It is 33rd in India in terms of population. It is called "The Coal Capital of India".

Mining 

Dhanbad is called "The Coal Capital of India". It is rich in coal. This led to the foundation and opening of many coal companies in Dhanbad. Bharat Coking Coal 's headquarters is in Dhanbad. This is a subsidiary of Coal India. Here are many coalfields. Dhanbad has many coal mining companies such as Central Coalfields and BCCL etc. In Dhanbad there are 112 mines. It is in the whole over in the city of Dhanbad.

Metals and cement 
Hindusthan Malleables & Forgings Limited is a company in Dhanbad. It has been manufacturing graded, malleable, S.G (ductile iron), manganese steel, and alloy steel castings. It is supported by well-equipped pattern shop, fettling and grinding Shop, heat treatment shop having bell and pit cycle annealing furnaces, machine shop, physical, chemical and metallographic testing facilities and spectrometer for chemical analysis. The company has been awarded ISO 9001-2008 and ISO / TS 16949–2009. It has a branch at Bhuli, Dhanbad.

Projects 
Projects and Development India Limited and ACC. Ltd at Sindri have many projects in and across Dhanbad. Indian railway is also a big and large employer in Dhanbad. This has been a large company in Dhanbad since its opening and establishment.

Information technology 
Software Technology Parks of India set up its IT park branch at Dhanbad; it opened recently. This will house several information technology and BPO companies. It is nearer to BIT Sindri. It was inaugurated by chief minister Hemant Soren online. It was built at a cost of Rs 18.67 crore, and the third for the company in Jharkhand, the other two being in Ranchi and in Jamshedpur. While the other is in Deoghar.

See also 
 Economy of Bokaro
Economy of Ranchi
 Economy of Deoghar
 Economy of Jamshedpur
 Economy of Giridih
 Economy of Jharkhand State
 Economy of India

References 

Dhanbad
Economy of Jharkhand
Dhanbad